The 2005 Women's Cricket World Cup was the eighth Women's Cricket World Cup, held in South Africa from 22 March to 10 April 2005. It was the first edition of the tournament to be hosted by South Africa.

The World Cup was the final tournament organised by the International Women's Cricket Council before it was merged with the International Cricket Council. Australia won the tournament, their fifth title, beating India in the final. England and New Zealand were the losing semi-finalists, while the other four teams that competed were Ireland, South Africa, Sri Lanka and West Indies. Karen Rolton was named the Player of the Tournament after scoring 107* in the final of the tournament. Charlotte Edwards was the leading run-scorer in the tournament, and Neetu David was the leading wicket-taker.

Squads

Group stage

Round 1

Round 2

Round 3

Round 4

Round 5

Round 6

Round 7

Semifinals

Final

Statistics

Most runs
The top five run-scorers are included in this table, ranked by runs scored, then by batting average, then alphabetically by surname.

Source: ESPNCricinfo

Most wickets
The top five wicket-takers are listed in this table, ranked by wickets taken and then by bowling average.

Source: ESPNCricinfo

References

External links
 Tournament homepage at ESPNCricinfo

 
Women's Cricket World Cup, 2005
Women's Cricket World Cup tournaments
World Cup
2005 in South African cricket
World Cup
March 2005 sports events in Africa
April 2005 sports events in Africa